Reubin O'Donovan Askew (September 11, 1928 – March 13, 2014) was an American politician, who served as the 37th governor of Florida from 1971 to 1979. A member of the Democratic Party, he served as the 7th U.S. Trade representative from 1979 to 1980 under President Jimmy Carter. He led on tax reform, civil rights, and financial transparency for public officials, maintaining an outstanding reputation for personal integrity.

Born in Muskogee, Oklahoma, Askew established a legal practice in Pensacola, Florida, after graduating from the University of Florida Levin College of Law. He served as a military intelligence officer in the United States Air Force during the Korean War. Askew won election to the Florida House of Representatives in 1958 and to the Florida Senate in 1962. He defeated incumbent Republican governor Claude R. Kirk Jr. in the 1970 gubernatorial election and won re-election in 1974.

As governor, Askew presided over the imposition of the state's first corporate tax. He was one of the first of the "New South" governors and supported school desegregation. Askew is widely thought to have been one of the state's best governors; in 2014 the Tampa Bay Times ranked him the second best governor in Florida history and the John F. Kennedy School of Government at Harvard University rated him one of the country's top ten governors of the 20th century. Askew was the keynote speaker at the 1972 Democratic National Convention and declined an offer to serve as George McGovern's running mate in the 1972 presidential election.

Askew served as the United States Trade Representative from 1979 to 1981. He sought the Democratic nomination in the 1984 presidential election but withdrew early in the race. After leaving public office, Askew taught at the public universities of Florida.

Early life and career
Askew was born in Muskogee, Oklahoma, the youngest of the six children of Leon G. Askew and Alberta (O'Donovan) Askew. His parents divorced when he was just two, primarily because of what Askew said was his father's "serious drinking problem." Two of his brothers later had similar problems. Askew chose to be a lifelong teetotaller and non-smoker after an unpleasant experience with a pipe as a teenager. After a final meeting under unpleasant circumstances when he was ten years old, Askew never saw his father again.

In 1937, his mother moved with Reubin to Pensacola, Florida. Askew's middle name, O'Donovan, was his mother's maiden name. His signature used the double initial (O'D.) in her honor. Reubin would sell magazines, shine shoes, bag groceries and sell his mother's pies that were homemade to help supplement her income. Reubin's mother was a waitress and a seamstress for the Works Progress Administration.

In 1944, Askew was initiated as a member of Escambia Chapter Order of DeMolay, the Masonic organization for young men. He graduated from Pensacola High School in 1946. Later that year, Askew entered the Army as a paratrooper, serving for two years; in 1948 he was discharged in the rank of sergeant.

Askew next attended Florida State University, where he was a brother of Delta Tau Delta and Alpha Phi Omega. At FSU, Askew was elected as student body president, beginning his long career in politics. He graduated from Florida State University in 1951 with a B.S. degree in public administration. He later completed law school at the University of Florida Levin College of Law.

During the Korean War, Askew served in the Air Force from 1951 to 1953, as a military intelligence officer. He oversaw the program for taking and analyzing airplane reconnaissance photographs of Western Europe. He felt uncomfortable with this task as it violated existing treaties.

In 1955, Askew returned to Pensacola, where he formed a law firm with David Levin.  The firm was called Levin & Askew, and now is named Levin Papantonio Law Firm.

Askew married Donna Lou Harper in August 1956. He proposed to her two weeks after the first date, and they married five months after. By all accounts, the two enjoyed a very happy marriage, and Askew remained faithful to her. They had two adopted children; a daughter and a son. Throughout his life, Askew refrained from smoking, drinking, swearing, and gambling.

Legislative career
In 1956, Askew was elected Assistant County Solicitor of Escambia County, Florida, as a Democrat. In 1958, he was elected to the Florida House of Representatives, representing Escambia County. After serving two terms in the House, in 1962 Askew was elected to the Florida Senate from the 2nd district, also representing Escambia. He was reelected to a redistricted seat encompassing both Escambia and Santa Rosa counties in 1966, and again in 1967 and 1968.

From 1969 to 1970, he served as president pro tempore of the Senate. In 1971 he received the Legion of Honor from the International Supreme Council of the Order of DeMolay.

Askew emerged as a progressive lawmaker: he supported reapportionment in the state legislature in order to recognize changes in population distribution and increase representation for urban counties, which had a higher population than rural ones. The state houses had been apportioned by geographic county, resulting in inequities that did not represent current state conditions. Urban areas were underrepresented in the legislature. As was typical of many states, rural legislators had resisted reapportionment in order to retain power.

Askew had opposed legal racial segregation and the continuing disenfranchisement of black voters. They had been disenfranchised since the turn of the century, when Florida had passed a new constitution with provisions for voter registration and elections that effectively blocked blacks from the polls. Passage of the Voting Rights Act of 1965 authorized the federal government to exercise oversight over jurisdictions in which classes of voters were historically underrepresented in voter rolls and voting patterns; African Americans were helped to re-enter the political system.

Governorship
Askew won the Democratic nomination for governor in 1970. Secretary of State of Florida Thomas Burton Adams, Jr., was his running-mate for lieutenant governor. In its endorsement of the Askew-Adams ticket, the Miami Herald said that Askew had "captured the imagination of a state that plainly deserves new leadership." During the campaign, the incumbent Republican governor, Claude R. Kirk Jr., ridiculed his opponent Askew as "a momma's boy who wouldn't have the courage to stand up under the fire of the legislators" and a "nice sweet-looking fellow chosen by liberals ... to front for them." Such rhetoric helped to reinvigorate the Democratic coalition. Mike Thompson, who managed the 1970 Republican gubernatorial primary campaign waged by state representative L. A. "Skip" Bafalis, sat out the general election between Kirk and Askew. Thompson later said that the often acerbic Kirk had demolished "the coalition of Republicans and conservative Democrats who elected him in 1966. ... The trail from Tallahassee to Palm Beach is littered with the bodies of former friends, supporters, and citizens -- all of whom made the fatal mistake of believing the words of Claude Kirk."

With 57% of the vote, Askew and Adams unseated Kirk and Lieutenant Governor Ray C. Osborne. (From 1887 to 1969, the Florida Constitution did not provide for a lieutenant governor. The change allowed the top two positions to be filled by running mates from the same political party.)

In 1974, Askew was re-elected, with J. H. Williams as his running mate. He is one of seven Florida governors to have been elected for two terms (the others were LeRoy Collins, Bob Graham, Lawton Chiles, Jeb Bush, Rick Scott, and Ron DeSantis). Askew was the first governor to serve two full four-year terms.

Through his two terms, Askew worked on tax reform. In 1971 he gained passage of the state's first corporate income tax. He also gained an increase in the homestead exemption.

In every political role, Askew argued for transparency in government. He tried three times to get the legislature to pass a bill requiring financial disclosure by public officials. When they did not, he used a provision of the 1968 constitution, collecting sufficient signatures to put the measure on the ballot in 1976. The voters passed the "Sunshine Amendment" by 78%, the first time the constitution was amended due to citizen action. It calls for full financial disclosure by public officials and candidates, a ban on gifts to legislators, and prohibits former officials from lobbying for two years after leaving office.

At a time of government scandals, he established a reputation for personal integrity and was known as "Reubin the Good." Government scandals erupted around him, but he was called "Reubin the Good" because of his personal integrity. According to a political foe, "He has established a kind of morality in office that causes people to have faith" in government.

In addition to dealing with state issues, Askew pursued collaboration with other governors: he chaired the Education Commission of the States (1973–1974), the Southern Governors' Conference (1974–1975), and the Democratic Governors' Conference (1976–1977). Governor Askew was chairman of the National Governors' Conference in 1977.

Civil rights issues and the New South
Askew was one of the first of the "New South" governors, elected in the same year as governors Jimmy Carter of Georgia, Dale Bumpers of Arkansas (who defeated Orval Faubus), and John C. West of South Carolina. They were later joined by Bill Clinton of Arkansas. Askew supported school desegregation and the controversial idea of busing to achieve racial balance (mandatory integration).

He expressed a progressive model in his appointments, naming the first black Justice of the State Supreme Court, Joseph Woodrow Hatchett. He appointed M. Athalie Range as Secretary of the Department of Community Affairs; she was the first black person appointed to state government since Reconstruction and the first woman to head a state agency in Florida. In 1978, Askew appointed Jesse J. McCrary Jr. as secretary of state; he was the first black person to hold a cabinet-level office in Florida in the modern era.

Capital punishment
After the 1972 U.S. Supreme Court decision in Furman v. Georgia  effectively overturned existing state laws for capital punishment in the United States, Florida was the first state to enact a new death penalty statute, which Governor Askew signed. But, Askew personally believed that the death penalty was appropriate only in rare cases. Afterward the Supreme Court accepted new state death-penalty laws in Gregg v. Georgia. Immediately after the ruling, which effectively reinstated the use of the death penalty in the United States, Governor Askew began signing death warrants. Executions were not resumed until the administration of his successor, Bob Graham.

Based on issues related to the cases of two life-sentenced inmates, Wilbert Lee and Freddie Pitts, Askew ordered a new investigation. It found they had been wrongfully convicted of murder in 1963. Askew participated in part of the inquiry and in 1975 pardoned both inmates, who had been removed from death row after the Supreme Court's decision halting capital punishment.

Presidential politics
Askew's national stature in the Democratic Party grew, and in 1972, he was the keynote speaker at the Democratic National Convention in Miami. For the 1972 presidential election, he was offered the vice presidential slot on the Democratic ticket with presidential nominee George McGovern, but he turned it down. He later accepted an appointment under President Jimmy Carter as chairman of the Advisory Committee on Ambassadorial Appointments.

Later career

Trade representative
Limited to two terms as governor by the Florida Constitution, Askew looked for his next opportunity. In 1979, he accepted President Jimmy Carter's invitation to serve as United States Trade Representative, continuing until Carter's term ended in January 1981. Askew was the first trade representative who held the title United States Trade Representative, not Special Trade Representative, as his predecessors were called.

Presidential bid in 1984 and senatorial bid in 1988
Askew joined a Miami law firm and at the same time began to organize a presidential bid for the 1984 presidential election. He announced his candidacy on February 23, 1983, after making visits to all 50 states. The first serious presidential candidate from Florida, Askew never gained traction within the national Democratic Party.  Although progressive on civil rights, Askew was notably more conservative than most of the other candidates. He was anti-abortion, but failed to win Catholic voters in Iowa; against the nuclear freeze, against the right of gays to work as teachers; and for President Ronald Reagan's invasion of Grenada in October 1983. Askew withdrew on March 1, 1984, after he finished last in the New Hampshire primary.

In 1987, he declared his candidacy for the U.S. Senate. But in May 1988, he withdrew from the contest, citing the need for perpetual fundraising. By that time, Florida voters were increasingly voting for Republican candidates for national office. They had started switching parties beginning in the mid-1960s.

In retirement

In 1994, former governor Askew was named to the founding class of the Florida DeMolay Hall of Fame.

The Reubin O'D. Askew School of Public Administration and Policy at Florida State University was named for him. It offers courses in government at several Florida universities. From 1999 until his death, Askew gave a graduate seminar at the school, on topics of state and local government as well as international trade.

For the ten years prior to that, Askew lectured and taught at each of the other ten public universities in the state. In 1994, the Reubin O'D Askew Institute on Politics and Society  at the University of Florida was established to provide a center for bringing together people to work on state issues. Askew also lectured and participated in conferences there.

Death
Askew died at a hospital in Tallahassee on March 13, 2014, aged 85, from complications of pneumonia and a stroke.

Legacy and honors
 Widely regarded as an effective governor, Askew was named one of the "Top 50 Floridians of the 20th Century" for his "Tax reform, racial justice and honesty in government."
 
 The Student Life Center at Florida State University was renamed as the Reubin O'D. Askew Student Life Center in his honor.
 The Florida State University Alumni Association awards notable alumni with the Reubin O'D. Askew Young Alumni Award as part of the Thirty Under Thirty program.
 The library at his high school alma mater, Pensacola High School, was also named after him.
 Interstate 110 in Pensacola is named the Reubin O'Donovan Askew Parkway.
 The main terminal at Pensacola International Airport is named the Reubin O'Donovan Askew Terminal.

He was designated a Great Floridian by the Florida Department of State in 1998. The program recognizes the achievements of Floridians, living and deceased, who have made major contributions to the progress and welfare of the state.

Electoral history

Democratic primary for governor, 1970
 Earl Faircloth – 227,413 (29.96%)
 Reubin O'Donovan Askew – 206,333 (27.18%)
 John E. Mathews – 186,053 (24.51%)
 Chuck Hall – 139,384 (18.36%)

Democratic primary for Governor runoff
 Reubin O'Donovan Askew – 447,025 (57.68%)
 Earl Faircloth – 328,038 (42.32%)

1970 Florida gubernatorial election
 Reubin O'Donovan Askew/Thomas Burton Adams, Jr. (D) – 984,305 (56.88%)
 Claude Roy Kirk, Jr./Ray C. Osborne (R, Inc.) – 746,243 (43.12%)

Democratic primary for governor, 1974
 Reubin O'Donovan Askew (Inc.) – 579,137 (68.83%)
 Ben Hill Griffin, Jr. – 137,008 (16.28%)
 Thomas Burton Adams, Jr. – 85,557 (10.17%)
 Norman Bie – 39,758 (4.73%)

1974 Florida gubernatorial election
 Reubin O'Donovan Askew (Inc.)/J. H. Williams (D) – 1,118,954 (61.20%)
 Jerry Thomas/Mike Thompson – 709,438 (38.80%)

1984 United States presidential election (Democratic primaries)
 Walter Mondale – 6,952,912 (38.34%)
 Gary Hart – 6,504,842 (35.87%)
 Jesse Jackson – 3,282,431 (18.10%)
 John Glenn – 617,909 (3.41%)
 George McGovern – 334,801 (1.85%)
 Unpledged – 146,212 (0.81%)
 Lyndon LaRouche – 123,649 (0.68%)
 Reubin O'Donovan Askew – 52,759 (0.29%)
 Alan Cranston – 51,437 (0.28%)
 Ernest Hollings – 33,684 (0.19%)
 Ronald Reagan (write-in) – 10,096 (0.06%)

See also

 List of University of Florida honorary degree recipients

Notes

Further reading
 David Colburn and Richard Scher, Florida's Gubernatorial Politics in the 20th Century, University Presses of Florida, 1980
 Gordon E. Harvey, The Politics of Trust: Reubin Askew and Florida in the 1970s, University of Alabama Press, 2015

External links

 Official Governor's portrait and biography from the State of Florida
 Florida DeMolay hall of Fame website
 DeMolay hall of Fame website
 Oral History Interview with Reubin Askew from Oral Histories of the American South
 Florida Legislature website: The 2007 Florida Statutes-Title XVIII
  Reubin O'D. Askew Institute on Politics and Society
 Askew School of Public Administration and Policy at Florida State University
 

|-

|-

|-

|-

|-

|-

|-

1928 births
2014 deaths
20th-century American politicians
American Presbyterians
Candidates in the 1984 United States presidential election
Carter administration cabinet members
Deaths from pneumonia in Florida
Democratic Party governors of Florida
Florida State University alumni
Florida State University faculty
Democratic Party Florida state senators
Fredric G. Levin College of Law alumni
Democratic Party members of the Florida House of Representatives
Military personnel from Florida
People from Pensacola, Florida
Politicians from Muskogee, Oklahoma
United States Army soldiers
United States Trade Representatives